Brenton is a name.

Brenton may also refer to:

Brenton, Nova Scotia
Brenton, West Virginia